Hyperolius stenodactylus is a species of frog in the family Hyperoliidae.
It is endemic to Cameroon.
Its natural habitats are rivers, freshwater marshes, and intermittent freshwater marshes.

References

stenodactylus
Endemic fauna of Cameroon
Amphibians described in 1931
Taxonomy articles created by Polbot